Siedlec  is a village in Wolsztyn County, Greater Poland Voivodeship, in west-central Poland. It is the seat of the gmina (administrative district) called Gmina Siedlec.

The village has a population of 1,200.

References

Siedlec